Meurette is a red wine sauce cooked with bacon, onions, shallots, mushrooms and various spices. This sauce used in oeufs en meurette and many other preparations in French cuisine.

References

French sauces